AIDAblu is a Sphinx-class cruise ship, operated by the German cruise line, AIDA Cruises. AIDAblu is the seventh ship in the cruise line. The vessel was delivered by Meyer Werft on 4 February 2010. She is a sister ship to AIDAdiva, AIDAbella, AIDAluna with a half deck more, and is followed by similar AIDAsol and AIDAmar. She has a passenger capacity of 2,050.

The name of AIDAblu was used for a former AIDA ship from 2004 to 2007.

Facilities
AIDAblu has six restaurants, ten bars,  of outer deck area and a  theatrium.

It also has the first brewery installed on a cruise ship, where the beers served in the ship are brewed.

AIDAblu has 1096 cabins, 374 are on the inside and 722 on the outside.
The callsign is IBWX . IMO 9398888 . MMSI 247282500.

Incidents
In 2010 Francesco Schettino, the captain of the ill-fated Costa Concordia before, was the captain of the Costa Atlantica, also a Carnival Corporation ship as it entered the port of Warnemünde, Germany, at too high a speed, allegedly causing damage to the AIDAblu.

On 18 May 2020, whilst the ship was docked in Hamburg, a male Filipino crew member of AIDAblu who had worked in the galley department was found dead in his cabin. The crew member was not suspected to have died of COVID-19.

References

External links

 Official AIDAblu website  
 

Ships of AIDA Cruises
Ships built in Papenburg
2009 ships